Man-Bat (Dr. Robert Kirkland "Kirk" Langstrom) is a fictional character appearing in American comic books published by DC Comics. Introduced in Detective Comics #400 (June 1970) as an enemy of the superhero Batman, the character belongs to the collective of adversaries that make up his rogues gallery. Originally portrayed as a supervillain, later incarnations show the Man-Bat as a sympathetic villain or antihero.

In the original version of the story, Kirk Langstrom was a zoologist who tried to give humans a bat's acute sonar sense. He managed to develop an extract that could supposedly do this, but upon testing it on himself, he transformed into an anthropomorphic feral half-bat hybrid, lacking sentience and acting purely on instinct. Batman managed to reverse the effects, but Langstrom would return as the Man-Bat time and time again, albeit not necessarily as a villain, as Langstrom would sometimes retain enough sanity to use his powers for good. Several other characters have since appeared as similar Man-Bat creatures, including Langstrom's wife Francine and father Abraham.

Since his debut at the end of the Silver Age of Comic Books, the Man-Bat has been featured in various media adaptations, including television series and video games. In 2017, the Man-Bat was ranked as IGNs 16th-best Batman villain.

Publication history
The character made his first appearance in Detective Comics #400 (June 1970) and was created by Frank Robbins and Neal Adams in collaboration with editor Julius Schwartz. The Man-Bat was the star of his own eponymous series in 1975–1976, which proved to be unpopular and was cancelled after only two issues.

Fictional character biography

Dr. Kirk Langstrom, a zoologist who specializes in chiropterology, develops an extract intended to give humans a bat's acute sonar sense and tests the formula on himself. The extract works, but it has a horrible side effect: it transforms him into a monstrous human/bat hybrid creature. This side effect makes him so distraught that it temporarily affects his sanity. He goes on a mad rampage until Batman finds a way to reverse the effects. Later, Langstrom takes the concoction again and the Man-Bat returns. He also coaxes his wife, Francine Langstrom, into drinking the serum and she goes through the same transformation, becoming the She-Bat. Together, they terrorize Gotham City until Batman once again restores them to normal.

On some occasions, Langstrom takes the serum and retains enough sanity to work for the forces of good. During one of these periods, he works with the detective Jason Bard. On another occasion, in Action Comics #600, Jimmy Olsen inadvertently puts Superman into a cave occupied by the Man-Bat to protect him from kryptonite radiation that had reached Earth following the explosion of Krypton. The Man-Bat calms the maddened Superman and then summons Hawkman, who helps Superman overcome the radiation. Kirk and Francine have a daughter, Rebecca ("Becky"), and a son, Aaron. Because of the effects the serum has on Aaron's DNA, he is born with a deadly illness. Francine turns him into a young Man-Bat to save his life. This occurs in issue #3 of the Man-Bat (vol. 2) miniseries by Chuck Dixon.

Infinite Crisis and beyond

The Man-Bat is sighted in Alexander Luthor Jr.'s Secret Society of Super Villains during the events of the 2005–2006 storyline Infinite Crisis.

In the aftermath of that storyline, both Kirk and Francine are shown to be alive in the 2006 "One Year Later" storyline. Talia al Ghul binds and gags Francine, and then threatens to poison her if Kirk does not give her the Man-Bat formula. After Langstrom gives her the formula, she releases Francine as promised. Talia utilizes the Man-Bat to turn some generic members of the League of Assassins into Man-Bat Commandos.

In Gotham Underground, the Man-Bat is apprehended by the Suicide Squad. He is one of the villains seen in Salvation Run. Francine appears in Batman and the Outsiders, serving as the team's technical advisor, and her assistant Salah Miandad operates the "blank" OMAC drone known as ReMAC. In issue #10 of that series, Kirk appears, seemingly healthy and also aiding Francine.

In the 2008 miniseries Final Crisis, the Man-Bat is turned into a Justifier and is shown attacking Switzerland's Checkmate Headquarters. During the 2009 "Battle for the Cowl" storyline, following Batman's apparent death, Kirk is haunted by nightmares of becoming the Man-Bat and killing his wife. When Francine disappears, he takes the serum and tries to follow her. After an altercation with the Outsiders, he returns to his human form and is captured by Doctor Phosphorus, who reveals that the serum is not necessary to trigger the change. Kirk discovers that Phosphorus has also captured Francine and becomes the Man-Bat to save her.

During the 2009–2010 Blackest Night storyline, Francine tracks down Kirk (as the Man-Bat), having created a cure, and revealed that Kirk's next transformation would be permanent if he did not drink it. Kirk attempts to take the cure, but his Man-Bat persona will not let him. Just as Kirk is about to drink it, Francine is wounded in the crossfire of the battle between Black Lantern Solomon Grundy and Bizarro (the latter of whom is already at the scene, trying to prevent Kirk from taking the cure). Distraught at Francine's injuries, Kirk transforms into the Man-Bat, seemingly permanently. In Batgirl (vol. 3) #10-11, the Man-Bat is seen under the control of the Calculator as a techno-zombie. In the "Collision" storyline of Red Robin, following Red Robin's actions against Ra's al Ghul and the League of Assassins, the latter attempts to murder people related to the Bat-Family. The Man-Bat, following Red Robin's orders, protects Julie Madison, a former lover of Bruce Wayne, against Ra's al Ghul's assassins.

The New 52

In The New 52 (a 2011 reboot of the DC Comics universe), the majority of Kirk Langstrom's history is rebooted. The Man-Bat serum first appears in Detective Comics (vol. 2) #18 (May 2013). Ignatius Ogilvy also comes into possession of the Man-Bat serum, which he uses as an airborne virus to spread throughout Gotham City's "900 Block".

In Detective Comics (vol. 2) #19 (June 2013), Kirk Langstrom first appears where he and his wife Francine are escorted by Batwoman to Batman's location. Langstrom reveals that he is the creator of the serum, intending to help deaf people. Taking responsibility as the creator of the serum, he uses a sample of the serum Batman had obtained to inject himself. This creates an anti-virus which also spreads through the air. Langstrom is turned into a Man-Bat (the last remaining Man-Bat) as his anti-virus cures the remaining citizens of Gotham. It was later revealed that Emperor Penguin was the one who released the virus. Emperor Penguin later made use of Langstrom's Man-Bat serum when he combined it with the Venom drug and one of Poison Ivy's plant concoctions to empower himself.

Langstrom re-appears in Batman Inc. (vol. 2) #10 (June 2013) apparently giving Batman the serum. He claims to be working on an aerosol antidote to the serum as well. The back-up feature of Detective Comics (vol. 2) #21 (August 2013), focuses on Langstrom and his wife. He changes from the Man-Bat form into his human form and becomes addicted to the Man-Bat serum, taking it every night. He apparently does not remember his actions from the previous night, yet worries that a string of reported killings are his fault.

During the "Forever Evil" storyline, the Man-Bat is among the villains recruited by the Crime Syndicate of America to join the Secret Society of Super-Villains. The Scarecrow and the Man-Bat attempt to steal the frozen Talons (assassins that are associated with the Court of Owls) from Blackgate while the Penguin is having a meeting with Bane. Bane arrives at Blackgate as the Man-Bat and his fellow Man-Bats are attempting to transport the Talons to Mr. Freeze and is able to keep one from leaving. The final issues of the series Batman: The Dark Knight would establish that Kirk is the son of a corrupt wealthy pharmaceutical businessman named Abraham Langstrom, who considers his son as a failure when compared to Bruce Wayne, the son of his business rival Thomas Wayne. Abraham would steal his son's serum, make some of his own improvements and use it to target the homeless (because no one would miss them) before being stopped by Batman, though he is able to plead temporary insanity to avoid going to prison.

DC Rebirth
In the Watchmen sequel Doomsday Clock, which is part of DC Rebirth, the Man-Bat is featured on the news as an example of the "Superman Theory" where the government has been experimenting on humans to give them superpowers. The Man-Bat later accompanied Black Adam in his attack on the White House.

In Harley Quinn Rebirth, Langstrom's wife goes on a rampage against Harley and her friends, turning Harley and her friend Tony into Man-Bats as part of the Penguin's plan to break Harley's spirit. Their other friends get Langstrom released and he helps them find the antidote before predictably escaping himself.

The Man-Bat later becomes a founding member of the second incarnation of Justice League Dark.

Powers and abilities
By taking his bat gland extract, Kirk Langstrom transforms himself into a bat-like creature. When taking an antidote or if the serum wears off, he reverts back to human form. As the Man-Bat, his strength, resiliency, speed, and agility are all augmented to inhuman levels. He possesses an extra set of digits that make up leathery bat-like wings that allow Kirk to fly. With bat radar, Kirk can emit high-pitch sound waves and hear those echoes when they bounce off nearby objects, enabling him to navigate perfectly in the darkness. If in the Man-Bat form for long periods of time, he loses control over his bestial side that works purely on instinct, thus making him prone to harm friend or foe alike.

As Kirk Langstrom, he is a highly intelligent scientist in the fields of biochemistry and zoology (particularly chiropterology).

Other characters named the Man-Bat

Francine Langstrom

Man-Bat Commandos
As mentioned above, Talia al Ghul captured Kirk Langstrom and threatened to poison Francine if he did not give her the Man-Bat formula. Kirk gives in to Talia al Ghul's demands where she uses the Man-Bat formula on some generic members of the League of Assassins to turn them into the group's Man-Bat Commandos.

During the "Batman R.I.P." story line, Talia al Ghul sends the Man-Bat Commandos to destroy Jezebel Jet's airplane.

In 2011, The New 52 rebooted the DC Universe. Various Man-Bats have appeared under the control of Talia al Ghul in her plot to destroy Batman. It is later explained that Talia al Ghul had an agent steal the serum from Langstrom's laboratory to use on her soldiers to create the Man-Bat Commandos.

During the "Forever Evil" storyline, some Man-Bat Commandos were used to help the Crime Syndicate hunt down the Rogues. The Mirror Master managed to trap some of them in the Mirror World. When a Man-Bat snatches up the Weather Wizard, the other Rogues members chase after it until it crashes into a solid wall of ice upon arriving in Mr. Freeze's territory.

Abraham Langstrom
Back when Thomas and Martha Wayne were still alive, Kirk Langstrom had a father named Abraham whose company, Patriarch Biopharmaceuticals, competed with Wayne Enterprises. Years after the death of Thomas and Martha, Abraham continued his shady deals, which involved exploiting his son's Man-Bat serum which he planned to profit from. He soon became addicted to the upgraded serum. When he became a Man-Bat, Abraham targeted the homeless people of Gotham City, draining them of their blood. This caused Batman to team up with Kirk Langstrom to fight Abraham. Because the skin of Abraham's Man-Bat form was tough, Batman injected himself with the cure and tricked Abraham into drinking his blood enough to transform back to normal. Batman then handed Abraham over to the police. After evading incarceration by claiming that he had no knowledge on what his Man-Bat form did, Abraham returned to his company, though he was wary of the fact that Batman may catch him if he ever makes a mistake.

Other versions

Countdown to Final Crisis
In Countdown to Final Crisis: The Search For Ray Palmer, an alternate version of the Man-Bat is shown. He is from Earth-19 (Gotham by Gaslight), and has experimented with bats similar to his mainstream counterpart. He is later defeated by the Blue Beetle and Batman.

Flashpoint
In the alternate timeline of the Flashpoint event, the Man-Bat is killed by Miranda Shrieve, the granddaughter of Matthew Shrieve. In a flashback, the Man-Bat is invited by Lt. Matthew Shrieve to be a new member of the Creature Commandos and then betrayed. Miranda also kills his entire family. It is revealed that the Man-Bat was working with General Sam Lane, who is responsible for the deaths of Miranda's family.

JLA: The Nail
In the Elseworlds story JLA: The Nail, a captured Man-Bat makes an appearance in Professor Hamilton's Cadmus Labs.

In other media

Television

 Kirk Langstrom / the Man-Bat appears in series set in the DC Animated Universe (DCAU), voiced by Marc Singer while Man-Bat's vocal effects were provided by special sound effects.
 First appearing in Batman: The Animated Series, this version is a zoologist at the Gotham City Zoo who developed a formula that would allow humans to "evolve" by granting them bat-like traits, which originated from his father-in-law, Dr. March, who helps keep Langstrom's identity hidden from the authorities. In the episode "On Leather Wings", the Man-Bat commits a series of chemical thefts and is mistaken for Batman, who proceeds to investigate him. He eventually discovers that the Man-Bat is Langstrom and captures him after a battle across the Gotham City skyline before taking him to the Batcave to cure him. The cured Langstrom later appears in the episode "Tyger, Tyger", helping Batman analyze a chemical that Dr. Emile Dorian used for his experiments. In the episode "Terror in the Sky", Langstrom is believed to have taken the Man-Bat formula again when a new bat-like creature appears in Gotham. However, it is eventually revealed that his wife Francine became "She-Bat" after she was accidentally exposed to a different Man-Bat serum created by Dr. March. In the end, Francine is cured by Batman and reunited with her husband.
 Kirk Langstrom makes a cameo appearance in The New Batman Adventures episode "Chemistry", attending Bruce Wayne's wedding.
 In Batman Beyond, a new trend dubbed "splicing" involves fusing bestial and human DNA. The new Batman ends up captured by the Splicers' leader Abel Cuvier and injected with vampire bat DNA, transforming him into a Man-Bat. He is later cured by Bruce Wayne.
 Kirk Langstrom / the Man-Bat appears in The Batman, voiced by Peter MacNicol while the Man-Bat's vocal effects are provided by special sound effects. This version is an employee at Wayne Enterprises who conducted research on bats and appears to have albinism. In the episode "The Man Who Would Be Bat", Bruce Wayne begins to cut off the funding for his project. Langstrom claims that he needs the project to cure his niece's deafness, but when Wayne discovers Langstrom was lying, he goes to the latter's office and learns of the scientist's obsession with Batman. When Langstrom arrives, he reveals that he wants to be feared like Batman and created a formula to help him achieve that. He drinks it, transforms into the Man-Bat, attacks Wayne, and escapes. Batman later confronts the Man-Bat in Gotham City's skies and brings him down, where he reverts to Langstrom and Batman destroys one of the scientist's serum vials. However, Langstrom drinks another vial, transforms back into the Man-Bat, and kidnaps GCPD Detective Ethan Bennett. Batman confronts the Man-Bat once more before the latter turns back into Langstrom and is taken to Arkham Asylum, where he attempts to recreate his serum. In the episode "Pets", the Penguin attempts to use a sonar device to gain control of a giant condor, unaware he has one that only works on bats. When he uses it, remnants of the Man-Bat serum in Langstrom's body cause him to transform into the Man-Bat and fly to the Penguin's side. While the Man-Bat proves to be the Penguin's loyal servant, Langstrom is furious at being used and threatens retaliation. Batman later foils the Penguin's plans with his own sonar device, causing the Man-Bat to revert to Langstrom, who is taken to Arkham alongside the Penguin. As of the episode "Attack of the Terrible Trio", Langstrom has renounced his Man-Bat identity and helps Batman develop an antidote for a mutagen that the Terrible Trio developed using his research.
 A race of Man-Bats appear in the Batman: The Brave and the Bold episode "Last Bat on Earth!". They are highly-intelligent, anthropomorphic inhabitants of Kamandi's post-apocalyptic future. Batman travels to this future to stop Gorilla Grodd, who has taken command of an army of apes. When Batman goes to the Batcave with Kamandi and Dr. Canus, they encounter a colony of "Man-Bats" and defeat their leader to drive them off. Having gained respect for Batman, the Man-Bats later assist him and Kamandi in defeating Grodd.
 Kirk Langstrom / the Man-Bat appears in Beware the Batman, voiced by Robin Atkin Downes. In the episode "Doppelgänger", Dr. Langstrom was working on a cure for diseases using bat DNA before Professor Pyg and Mister Toad raid his laboratory and force him at gunpoint to take a corrupted version of his formula, which mutates him into a man/bat hybrid. Pyg and Toad use a drug-filled collar to control the Man-Bat and force him to rob chemicals so that they can recreate Dr. Langstrom's formula and turn more humans into human/beast hybrids. However, Batman and Katana free the Man-Bat, who helps them defeat Pyg and Toad before leaving to find a cure for his condition. In the episode "Alone", Katana recruits the Man-Bat, among others, into the Outsiders to help Batman fight Deathstroke.
 The Man-Bat appears in Lego DC Comics: Batman Be-Leaguered, voiced by Dee Bradley Baker.
 The Man-Bat appears in the Scooby-Doo and Guess Who? episode "What a Night for a Dark Knight!". After the Man-Bat kidnaps Alfred Pennyworth, Batman and Mystery Inc. join forces to save him. At first, the former suspects Kirk Langstrom, but rules him out upon realizing he is incarcerated at Arkham Asylum. After rescuing Pennyworth, the heroes discover the Joker had dressed up as the Man-Bat as part of a plot to get the password to Bruce Wayne's bank accounts.
 The Man-Bat makes cameo appearances in Harley Quinn. This version is a member of the Legion of Doom in season one.

Film
 The Man-Bat was considered to appear in one of the unproduced scripts for a third Joel Schumacher Batman film, the unmade Batman Unchained, but was dropped in favor of the Scarecrow and Harley Quinn. The Man-Bat was also meant to appear in an alternate proposal, Lee Shapiro's Batman: DarKnight script, alongside the Scarecrow and due to be played by Mark Linn-Baker or Martin Short. However, both projects never came to pass.
 An alternate universe version of the Man-Bat hybridized with Catwoman called the She-Bat makes a cameo appearance in Justice League: Crisis on Two Earths, as a lesser member of the Crime Syndicate.
 Kirk Langstrom and the Man-Bat Commandos appear in Son of Batman, with the former voiced by Xander Berkeley and the latter's vocal effects provided by Dee Bradley Baker. Langstrom works with Ra's al Ghul in an attempt to create a Man-Bat army to strengthen the League of Assassins. To ensure his complicity, Deathstroke captures Langstrom and takes his wife Francine and daughter Rebecca hostage as leverage. However, Batman and Damian Wayne rescue the Langstroms. While the mutagen is completed, Langstrom creates an antidote to stop the Man-Bat Commandos.
 Kirk Langstrom / the Man-Bat appears in the Batman Unlimited series of films, voiced by Phil LaMarr.
 He first appears in Batman Unlimited: Animal Instincts. Langstrom was working on a serum to help the deaf and blind, but accidentally turns himself into the Man-Bat. The Penguin uses this to his advantage, giving Langstrom cures in exchange for the Man-Bat's help with crimes and Langstrom creating robotic beasts to bolster the Penguin's "Animalitia". However, Red Robin manages to get Langstrom's mind to surface in the Man-Bat, allowing him to help defeat the Penguin and defend Gotham against the Midas Meteor, burning out the formula and turning him back into Langstrom in the process.
 Langstrom returns in Batman Unlimited: Mechs vs. Mutants. As of this film, he now works as a robotics expert for Bruce Wayne.
 An alternate universe version of Kirk Langstrom appears in Justice League: Gods and Monsters, voiced by Michael C. Hall. While in college, this version became a pseudo-vampire in an attempt to cure his cancer with his best friend Will Magnus carrying out additional research to develop a separate cure for his transformation. Langstrom went on to become his universe's "Batman" and joined forces with Hernan Guerra / Superman and Bekka / Wonder Woman to form their universe's Justice League.
 The Man-Bat appears in Lego DC Comics Super Heroes: Justice League: Attack of the Legion of Doom, with his vocal effects provided again by Dee Bradley Baker. He is among the villains that audition for a spot on the Legion of Doom, only to eliminated by Lex Luthor.
 The Man-Bat makes a non-speaking cameo appearance in The Lego Batman Movie.

Video games

Lego DC series 

 The Man-Bat appears as a boss and unlockable playable character in Lego Batman: The Videogame, with vocal effects provided by Chris Edgerly. In the Nintendo DS version, the Man-Bat is unlocked through the "Villain Hunt" mini-game. In all other versions, he can be purchased from the Batcomputer after he is defeated in the story mode.
 The Man-Bat appears as an optional boss and unlockable playable character in Lego Batman 2: DC Super Heroes, with his vocal effects provided by Fred Tatasciore.
 The Man-Bat appears as an unlockable playable character in Lego Batman 3: Beyond Gotham, with his vocal effects provided by Dee Bradley Baker.
 The DCAU version of Man-Bat appears as a playable character in Lego DC Super-Villains, via the "Batman: The Animated Series Level Pack" DLC.

Other games
 The Man-Bat appears in the SNES version of The Adventures of Batman & Robin.
 Kirk Langstrom / the Man-Bat appears in Batman: Arkham Knight, voiced by Loren Lester. Following an encounter on Gotham City's Miagani Island during the story mode, a side mission sees Batman investigating the Man-Bat. After catching up to him, Batman collects a blood sample and eventually learns of Langstrom. While investigating the scientist's lab, Batman learns of Langstrom's experiments in using vampire bat DNA to cure deafness and how his first attempt resulted in him transforming into the Man-Bat and accidentally killing his wife Francine. Batman synthesizes an antidote and administers it to Langstrom before taking him to the Gotham City Police Department's headquarters, where he is left crying over Francine's fate. If the player returns to Langstrom's lab after this, they will find Francine's body gone and a broken television screen with the words "forever my love" written on it in an unknown material. If the console or computer's date is changed to October 31 after capturing Langstrom, Batman will re-encounter the Man-Bat while free-roaming, but will not have the option to pursue him. If Batman returns to the GCPD headquarters after this, he will find two police officers looking into Langstrom's destroyed cell, commenting that he transformed into the Man-Bat again and escaped.
 Kirk Langstrom and a variation of the Man-Bat Commandos appear in Gotham Knights. The former was a member of the Court of Owls who secretly conducted work with their enemies, the League of Shadows. After the Court discovered Langstrom's treachery and killed him for it, the League steals his research and combine it with Lazarus Pit chemicals to create an army of mutant Man-Bats, which are defeated by the Gotham Knights.

Miscellaneous
 The Man-Bat appears in issue #28 of the Super Friends comics.
 The DCAU incarnation of Kirk Langstrom / Man-Bat appears in issue #21 of The Batman Adventures. He is forcibly transformed into the Man-Bat and recruited by Dr. Emile Dorian, who hopes to use his assistance to form a "House of Dorian". Additionally in another issue, Dr. Stefen Perry steals the Man-Bat serum from Langstrom and transforms into his own Man-Bat before he is defeated by Batman and arrested by the Gotham City Police Department.
 The DCAU incarnations of Kirk and Francine Langstrom appear in the Batman Beyond tie-in comic. In flashbacks, the Langstroms lived peacefully, studying sonics and going on to have two children. However, Francine developed an aggressive form of Parkinson's disease and was given a short life expectancy. In response, Kirk attempted to perfect the Man-Bat serum to save her, but she died before he could do so. Following this, his children left him, angered that he did not spend time with her during her final days. Devastated, Kirk turned to his perfected serum, became the Man-Bat once more, and lived in secret. During this period of time, he rescued a girl named Tey from the Jokerz, injected her with the serum, and fell in love with her. In the present, Kirk builds a cult of Man-Bats with the intention of using Kanium to help him and his cult control themselves more effectively. Bruce Wayne tries to reason with him, but Kirk views them both as monsters and attempts to use a bomb to kill themselves. After Batman rescues them, Kirk tells Wayne to use his second chance wisely before killing himself with his bomb.
 The Man-Bat appears in Smallville Season 11 as an inmate of Arkham Asylum. After acquiring a yellow ring of Parallax and becoming a Yellow Lantern, Man-Bat and other empowered inmates battle Batman and Nightwing until Superman intervenes long enough for Emil Hamilton to reboot the rings and depower the inmates. Following Parallax's defeat, the inmates are turned to Arkham.
 The Man-Bat appears in issue #12 of the All-New Batman: The Brave and the Bold comic series spin-off of the Batman: The Brave and the Bold.
 A new incarnation of the Man-Bat appears in issue #4 of the Beware the Batman tie-in comic book. Tim Quan, an acquaintance of Barbara Gordon's, sneaks into Kirk Langstrom's laboratory and ends up mutating into a Man-Bat. Having become more unstable than Langstrom, Quan goes on a rampage and kidnaps Barbara. Batman teams up with Langstrom to find and cure Quan, at the expense of Langstrom's own cure.
 Kirk Langstrom / Batman appears in the Justice League: Gods and Monsters Chronicles episode "Twisted", voiced again by Michael C. Hall. He tracks and confronts deranged murderer the Harlequin before biting her neck and drinking her blood.
 The Man-Bat appears in the Injustice: Gods Among Us prequel comic.
 The Man-Bat appears in the Injustice 2 prequel comic as a member of Ra's al Ghul's Suicide Squad until he is killed amidst Gorilla Grodd's betrayal.

See also
 List of Batman family enemies

References

Animal supervillains
Batman characters
Characters created by Frank Robbins
Characters created by Neal Adams
Comics characters introduced in 1970
Villains in animated television series
DC Comics animals
DC Comics characters who are shapeshifters
DC Comics characters who can move at superhuman speeds
DC Comics characters with superhuman senses
DC Comics characters with superhuman strength
DC Comics hybrids
DC Comics male superheroes
DC Comics male supervillains
DC Comics metahumans
DC Comics scientists
Fictional bats
Fictional biologists
Fictional deaf characters
Fictional human–animal hybrids
Fictional characters with alter egos
Fictional characters who can manipulate sound
Fictional characters with superhuman durability or invulnerability
Fictional mass murderers
Fictional monsters
Fictional therianthropes
Supervillains with their own comic book titles
Video game bosses